Kemal Ishmael (born May 6, 1991) is a former American football linebacker and safety. He was drafted by the Falcons in the seventh round (243rd overall) of the 2013 NFL Draft. He played college football at UCF.

College career
Ishmael played college football at UCF.

Professional career

2013 season
In the 2013 NFL Draft, Ishmael was selected in the seventh round with the 243rd overall pick by the Atlanta Falcons. In his rookie year, he got very little playing time. Head coach Mike Smith was worried he lacked the size and speed needed to start professionally and Ishmael was set to play behind veteran Thomas DeCoud and fellow rookie Zeke Motta. When both Motta and DeCoud were injured, Ishmael was active but only played three defensive snaps in all of 2013.

2014 season
On September 18, 2014, Ishmael got his first career interception off Tampa Bay Buccaneers quarterback Josh McCown and returned it 23 yards for a touchdown on Thursday Night Football. From week 9 to 11, Ishmael had an interception in all three games.

2015 season
Ishmael played in all 16 games with five starts in 2015, totalling 52 tackles with one interception against Blake Bortles and three passes defensed.

2016 season
Ishmael played in 13 games with four starts in 2016, totaling 49 tackles playing at safety and linebacker throughout the season before being placed on injured reserve on December 16, 2016 with a shoulder injury. In the 2016 season, the Falcons would reach Super Bowl LI. Ishmael would not get to participate due to his injury.

2017 season
On March 14, 2017, Ishmael signed a one-year, $2.5 million contract extension with the Falcons.

2018 season
On April 4, 2018, Ishmael re-signed with the Falcons on a one-year contract.

2019 season
On April 3, 2019, Ishmael re-signed with the Falcons on another one-year contract. On Wednesday July 24, 2019, it was announced that with strong safety J.J. Wilcox out for the season with a torn right ACL, Ishmael would return to his original position as SS and now see 75 percent of his practice time at safety and 25 percent at linebacker. On September 23, 2019, Ishmael took over the starting strong safety role he had earlier in his career after another season ending injury to Pro Bowl safety Keanu Neal after he tore his Achilles.

After becoming a free agent in March 2020, Ishmael had a tryout with the San Francisco 49ers on August 18, 2020.

References

External links
 Atlanta Falcons bio
 Central Florida Knights bio

1991 births
Living people
American football safeties
Atlanta Falcons players
Players of American football from Miami
UCF Knights football players
Ed Block Courage Award recipients